Watley is a surname. Notable people with the surname include:

Jody Watley (born 1959), American singer-songwriter
Michele Evette Watley (born 1968), American pornographic actress and singer
Natasha Watley (born 1981), American softball player

Places

England
Watley's End, a village in South Gloucestershire, England

Jamaica
 Watley Ave, a city in Kingston, Jamaica

United States
 Watley Ct, a court in Hoschton, Georgia, United States
 Watley Place Northeast, a place in Hoschton, Georgia, United States

See also
Wadley
Whateley (disambiguation)
Whately (disambiguation)
Whatley (disambiguation)
Wheatley (disambiguation)
Whiteley
Whitley (disambiguation)